The West Farnam neighborhood or the Blackstone neighborhood in Omaha, Nebraska is located from Dodge Street on the north to Leavenworth Street on the south, Highway 75/Interstate 480 on the east to South 52nd Street on the west. In 1997, the Gold Coast Historic District was formed from the West Farnam neighborhood and the Park Place neighborhood, known today as Cathedral. Named for its principal thoroughfare, West Farnam was a prime real estate area in the first quarter of the 20th century. It is home to several historical landmarks, including houses, churches, and former hotels.

Historic properties

See also
Neighborhoods of Omaha, Nebraska
History of Omaha

References

Neighborhoods in Omaha, Nebraska
History of Omaha, Nebraska
Historic districts in Omaha, Nebraska